Fontainebleau is a commune in the metropolitan area of Paris. Around the area is also located:
 Palace of Fontainebleau, one of the largest French royal châteaux
 Forest of Fontainebleau
 Arrondissement of Fontainebleau

Fontainebleau may also refer to:

Art and music
 Fontainebleau (album), a 1956 jazz album by Tadd Dameron
 Fontainebleau Schools, French music and art schools 
 School of Fontainebleau, two periods of late Renaissance French Art

Places
 Fontainebleau, Florida, U.S.
 Fontainebleau, Gauteng, South Africa
 Fountainbleau, Missouri, U.S.
 Fontainebleau, New Orleans, Louisiana, U.S.
 Fontainebleau State Park, St. Tammany Parish, Louisiana, U.S.
 Fontainebleau, which amalgamated into Weedon, Quebec, Canada

Military
 Fontainebleau Agreements, a proposed arrangement between the France and the Vietminh at the outbreak of the First Indochina War 
 Treaty of Fontainebleau (disambiguation), list of all the treaties signed at Fontainebleau

Other
 Fontainebleau Resorts, a resort-hotel company
 Fontainebleau Resort Las Vegas
 Fontainebleau Miami Beach

See also